Naya Raj Pant (1913–2002) was an Nepalese polymath who was active as a poet, astronomer, mathematician, scholar, and historian. He is best known for establishing Saṃśodhana Maṇḍala, research organisation, on 20 September 1952.

He was born on 10 August 1913 in Mahaboudha, Kathmandu to Krishna Datta, and Yajnapriya Datta. Pant died on 4 November 2002.

In 1986–87, he won the Madan Puraskar, Nepal's highest literary honour.

Notable works

 Licchavisaṃvatko nirṇaya
 Nayarāja Pantakā gaṇitīya kr̥ti
 Śrī 3 Mahārāja Padmaśamaśerakā kurā

References 

1913 births
2002 deaths
20th-century Nepalese poets
20th-century Nepalese writers
Madan Puraskar winners
Nepalese astronomers
20th-century Nepalese historians
Nepalese male poets
Nepalese mathematicians
Nepalese poets
People from Kathmandu